Breed of the Sea is a 1926 American silent film directed by and starring Ralph Ince and starring Ince, Margaret Livingston and Dorothy Dunbar.

Cast
 Ralph Ince as Tod Pembroke,  Captain Blaze Devine / Tom Pembroke  
 Margaret Livingston as Marietta Rawdon  
 Pat Harmon as Lije Marsh  
 Alphonse Ethier as Bully Rawden  
 Dorothy Dunbar as Ruth Featherstone  
 Shannon Day as Martha Winston

References

Bibliography
 Quinlan, David. The Illustrated Guide to Film Directors. Batsford, 1983.

External links

1926 films
Films directed by Ralph Ince
American silent feature films
1920s English-language films
American black-and-white films
Film Booking Offices of America films
1920s American films